VRF may refer to:
 Virtual routing and forwarding
 Variable refrigerant flow, for heating and cooling
 Verifiable random function, in cryptography
 Vitiligo Research Foundation
 Visiting research fellow (see Visiting scholar)